A list of films produced in Argentina in 1974:

External links and references
 Argentine films of 1974 at the Internet Movie Database

1974
Argentine
Films